is a railway station on the Odakyu Odawara Line in Shibuya, Tokyo, Japan, operated by the private railway operator Odakyu Electric Railway.

Station layout
The station has two side platforms serving two tracks.

Platforms

History
Sangubashi Station opened on 1 April 1927.

Station numbering was introduced to the Odakyu terminal in 2014 with Shinjuku being assigned station number OH03.

Renovation works to the east exit started in November 2018 and were completed in November 2020. The updated station building was constructed using wood from western Tokyo; the design elements, in particular its use of Shinto-inspired architecture, reflect its proximity to the Meiji Shrine.

In popular culture 
In the manga Our Precious Conversations the train station where the two protagonists have their first chats is based on Sangūbashi Station.

Surrounding area 
 Meiji Shrine
 Yoyogi Park

References 

Railway stations in Japan opened in 1927
Odakyu Odawara Line
Stations of Odakyu Electric Railway
Railway stations in Tokyo
Buildings and structures in Shibuya